Garfield Building may refer to:

Garfield Building (Los Angeles, California)
Edwin S. George Building, Detroit, Michigan
Garfield Building (New York City)
Garfield Building (Cleveland)

See also
Garfield Township Hall, Beresford, South Dakota, listed on the NRHP in Clay County, South Dakota
Garfield Memorial, Cleveland, Ohio
Garfield Methodist Church, Phoenix, Arizona, listed on the NRHP in Phoenix, Arizona
Garfield Library (disambiguation)
Garfield House (disambiguation)